Hagan (also Hagen) is an unincorporated community in Big Bend, Chippewa County, Minnesota, United States.

Notes

Unincorporated communities in Chippewa County, Minnesota
Unincorporated communities in Minnesota